List of military corps – List of Finnish corps in the Continuation War

This is a list of Finnish corps that existed during the Continuation War, 1941–1944.
 I Corps
 II Corps
 III Corps
 IV Corps
 V Corps
 VI Corps
 VII Corps

See also 
 Finnish Army
 List of Finnish corps in the Winter War
 List of Finnish divisions in the Continuation War
 List of Finnish divisions in the Winter War

References 
 
 

Continuation War
Finnish corps
Military units and formations of Finland in World War II
Lists of military units and formations of Finland